A cholinergic crisis is an over-stimulation at a neuromuscular junction due to an excess of acetylcholine (ACh), as a result of the inactivity of the AChE enzyme, which normally breaks down acetylcholine.

Symptoms and diagnosis 
As a result of cholinergic crisis, the muscles stop responding to the high synaptic levels of ACh, leading to flaccid paralysis, respiratory failure, and other signs and symptoms reminiscent of organophosphate poisoning. Other symptoms include increased sweating, salivation, bronchial secretions along with miosis (constricted pupils).  

This crisis may be masked by the concomitant use of atropine along with cholinesterase inhibitor medication in order to prevent side effects. Flaccid paralysis resulting from cholinergic crisis can be distinguished from myasthenia gravis by the use of the drug edrophonium (Tensilon), as it only worsens the paralysis caused by cholinergic crisis but strengthens the muscle response in the case of myasthenia gravis. (Edrophonium is a cholinesterase inhibitor, hence increases the concentration of acetylcholine present).

Some of the symptoms of increased cholinergic stimulation include:
 Salivation: stimulation of the salivary glands 
 Lacrimation: stimulation of the lacrimal glands (tearing)
 Urination: relaxation of the internal sphincter muscle of urethra, and contraction of the detrusor muscles
 Defecation
 Gastrointestinal distress:     Smooth muscle tone changes causing gastrointestinal problems, including cramping
 Emesis: Vomiting 
 Miosis constriction of the pupils of the eye via stimulation of the pupillary constrictor muscles
 Muscle spasm: stimulation of skeletal muscle (due to nicotinic acetylcholine receptor stimulation)

Cause
Cholinergic crisis, sometimes known by the mnemonic "SLUDGE syndrome" (Salivation, Lacrimation, Urination, Defecation, Gastrointestinal distress and Emesis), can be a consequence of:
 Contamination with - or excessive exposure to - certain chemicals including:
nerve agents, (e.g., sarin, VX, Novichok agents).
organophosphorus insecticides (e.g., parathion, aldicarb)
nicotine poisoning can be thought of as a subset of cholinergic crisis, as it also involves excessive parasympathetic stimulation.
 Ingestion of certain poisonous fungi (particularly the muscarine-containing members of the genera Inocybe and Clitocybe).
In medicine, this is seen in patients with myasthenia gravis who take too high a dose of medications such as cholinesterase inhibitors, or seen following general anaesthesia, when too high a dose of a cholinesterase inhibitor drug is given to reverse surgical muscle paralysis.

Treatment 

Some elements of the cholinergic crisis can be reversed with antimuscarinic drugs like atropine or diphenhydramine, but the most dangerous effect - respiratory depression, cannot. 

The neuromuscular junction, where the brain communicates with muscles (like the diaphragm, the main breathing muscle), works by acetylcholine activating nicotinic acetylcholine receptors and leading to muscle contraction. Atropine only blocks muscarinic acetylcholine receptors (a different receptor class than the nicotinic receptors at the neuromuscular junction), so atropine will not improve the muscle strength and ability to breathe in someone with cholinergic crisis. Such a patient will require neuromuscular blocking drugs and mechanical ventilation until the crisis resolves on its own.

See also 
 Physostigmine

References 

Toxicology
Neurotransmitters
Parasympathomimetics
Medicinal chemistry
Medical mnemonics